John Priest may refer to:
 John W. Priest (died 1859), American architect
 John G. Priest (1822–1900), businessman and social and civic leader in St. Louis, Missouri
 John T. Priest, American public servant
 Johnny Priest (1891–1979), Major League Baseball infielder